The 2012 BBC Sports Personality of the Year Award, presented on 16 December, was the 59th presentation of the BBC Sports Personality of the Year Award. Awarded annually by the British Broadcasting Corporation (BBC), the main titular award honours an individual's British sporting achievement over the past year, with the winner selected by public vote from a 12-person shortlist.

The winner of the 2012 award was Bradley Wiggins, the Tour de France and Olympic time trial champion. The awards ceremony was hosted at ExCeL London, which had been a venue for several sports during the 2012 Olympics and Paralympics.

Basis of nominations
Prior to 2012, a panel of thirty sports journalists each submit a list of ten contenders. From these contenders a shortlist of ten nominees is determined—currently, in the event of a tie at the end of the nomination process, a panel of six former award winners determined the nominee by a Borda count. The shortlist was announced at the beginning of December, and the winner was determined on the night of the ceremony by a public telephone vote.

In 2011 the shortlist produced only contained male competitors, which caused media uproar.  The selection process for contenders was changed for the 2012 (and future) awards as follows:

The BBC introduced an expert panel who were asked to devise a shortlist that reflected UK sporting achievements on the national and/or international stage, represented the breadth and depth of UK sports and took into account "impact" within and beyond the sport or sporting achievement in question.

The 2012 panel comprised:
Barbara Slater, Director of BBC Sport (Chair)
The BBC’s Head of TV Sport (Philip Bernie)
The Executive Editor of BBC Sports Personality of the Year (Carl Doran).
A representative from BBC Radio 5 Live - this year, Eleanor Oldroyd.
Three national newspaper sports editors (to be rotated annually) - this year, Mike Dunn (The Sun), Lee Clayton (Daily Mail) and Matthew Hancock (The Observer)
Three former nominees (to be appointed annually) - this year, Sir Steve Redgrave, Baroness Tanni Grey-Thompson and Denise Lewis OBE
A pan-sports broadcaster/journalist - this year, Sue Mott
Baroness Sue Campbell, Chair of UK Sport.

The panel would endeavour to produce a shortlist based on reaching a consensus view. If a consensus view cannot be reached on all or some of the candidates, then they will be asked to vote for the remaining candidates.

In 2012, following the success of the London 2012 Olympic Games, the SPOTY shortlist was expanded to 12 contenders.

Nominees
The nominees for the 2012 award, as described by the BBC, and their share of the votes cast were as follows:

Voting process
The winner was decided by a public vote on the night of the awards ceremony. Unlike past years the voting opened after every contender has shown a video of them achieving in their sport, not at the beginning of the show.

Other awards
In addition to the main award as "Sports Personality of the Year", several other awards were also announced:

 Team of the Year: Team GB
 Coach of the Year: Dave Brailsford
 Overseas Personality: Usain Bolt
 Young Personality: Josef Craig
 Unsung Hero Award: Sue and Jim Houghton (Community Sports Organisers)
 Lifetime Achievement: Lord Coe
 Helen Rollason Award: Martine Wright

In Memoriam

Sid Waddell
Tommy Godwin
Gary Ablett
Teofilo Stevenson
Don Wilson
John Connelly
Angelo Dundee
Sarah Burke
Nigel Doughty
John Oaksey
Terry Spinks
Mitchell Cole
David Tait
Brian Woolnough
Danny Fullbrook
Lee Richardson
Mervyn Davies
John Bond
Stephen Packer
Jack Taylor
Tom Maynard
Alexander Dale Oen
Dave Sexton
Jocky Wilson
Kenny Morgans
Paidi O Se
Phil Taylor
Emanuel Steward
Gordon West
Selorm Kuadey
Sid Watkins
Mitchell Todd
Ivor Powell
Joe Egan
Alan McDonald
Josh Gifford
Margaret Osborne duPont
Campbell Gillies
Nevin Spence

References

External links
Official website

BBC Sports Personality of the Year awards
2012 in British television
2012 in British sport
Bbc
Bbc
December 2012 sports events in the United Kingdom